Grumpy Old Women is a British television series, continuing in the same vein as its predecessor, Grumpy Old Men. Both programmes are shown on BBC Two. The first two series were narrated by Alison Steadman, and the third by Judith Holder (who is the 'grumpy old woman' in the clips). The show started as a special one-off Christmas special; however, because of its popularity, it spawned a regular series, a book (see below) and stage show.

Narrators

Contributors

Episodes

Series One

Series Two

Series Three

Book reference 
Grumpy Old Women (2005) Judith Holder

Live Show

for more information, see Grumpy Old Women Live

In 2005, a live show was formed, and went on a sell out national tour, as well as a spell in Australia.

References

External links 
 
Official 'Live Tour' site
BBC Press Office: Grumpy Old Women
Grumpy Old Women Live

2004 British television series debuts
BBC Television shows
2007 British television series endings